Crepidochares austrina is a moth in the Eriocottidae family. It was described by Davis in 1990. It is found in Chile.

The length of the forewings is 4.6–6 mm for males and 5.8-6.1 mm for females. The forewings are light bronzy brown, with a complex pattern of pale buff to reddish brown and dark fuscous scales. The hindwings are uniform shiny grey. Adults are on wing from the mid-November to mid-December in one generation per year.

Etymology
The species name refers to the more southern distribution when compared to the only other Chilean eriocottid, Crepidochares aridula and is derived from Latin austrinus (meaning southern).

References

Moths described in 1990
Eriocottidae
Lepidoptera of Chile
Endemic fauna of Chile